JKT Ruvu Stars is a Tanzanian football club based in Dodoma.

They are named after JKT Ruvu Poultry farm and they play at 30,000-capacity Jamhuri Stadium.

The team was relegated from the Tanzanian Premier League after the 2006/2007 season.

Achievements
Tanzanian Cup: 1
 2002

External links
Logo
 JKT Ruvu from FIFA website

References

Football clubs in Tanzania
Dodoma